Samuel John Cato (born 23 November 1992) is an English former first-class cricketer.

Early life and career 
Cato was born at Chiswick in November 1992. He was educated at St Paul's School, before going up New College, Oxford. While studying at Oxford, Cato made three first-class appearances in The University Match for Oxford University between 2013–15. He scored exactly 100 runs in his three matches, with a high score of 33, in addition to taking 4 wickets with best figures of 2 for 43.

References

External links

1992 births
Living people
People from Chiswick
People educated at St Paul's School, London
Alumni of New College, Oxford
English cricketers
Oxford University cricketers